Feeding the Wolves may refer to:

 Feeding the Wolves (10 Years album), 2010
 Feeding the Wolves (EP), a 2005 EP by Josh Pyke